Wars of America is a colossal bronze sculpture by Mount Rushmore sculptor Gutzon Borglum and his assistant Luigi Del Bianco containing "forty-two humans and two horses", located in Military Park in Newark, New Jersey. The sculpture sets on a base of granite from Stone Mountain.

The sculpture  was erected in 1926, eight years after World War I ended, but its intent was broadened to honor all of America's war dead.  In describing it, Borglum said "The design represents a great spearhead.  Upon the green field of this spearhead we have placed a Tudor sword, the hilt of which represents the American nation at a crisis, answering the call to arms."

The work was funded by a $100,000 bequest by Newark businessman Amos Hoagland Van Horn, who also funded Borglums Seated Lincoln, also located in Newark.
The sculpture was added to the National Register of Historic Places on October 28, 1994.

See also
National Register of Historic Places listings in Essex County, New Jersey

References

Public art in Newark, New Jersey
Monuments and memorials in New Jersey
Bronze sculptures in New Jersey
Horses in art
1926 sculptures
Tourist attractions in Newark, New Jersey
National Register of Historic Places in Newark, New Jersey
New Jersey Register of Historic Places
Sculptures by Gutzon Borglum
Culture of Newark, New Jersey
War art